Lim Mooi Keow, better known by her stage name as Lin Meijiao, is a Singaporean actress.

Life and career
Lin was educated at Ahmad Ibrahim Secondary School.

Lin has acted in many drama serials and is a multi-nominee for the Best Supporting Actress category at the annual Star Awards. She was awarded the Best Supporting Actress at the 1995 Shanghai International Film Festival for her role in the drama serial Silk of Love.

In 2002, her outstanding performance in Brotherhood, a regional co-production starring Hong Kong artiste Jordan Chan and MediaCorp actor Christopher Lee, won her a nomination in the Best Supporting Actress category in the Star Awards.

Lin was involved in numerous MediaCorp blockbuster dramas, such as The Little Nyonya, Breakout and Joys of Life. Lin also co-hosted Golden Age, a variety show for senior citizens and was part of the cast for the second season of the hit sitcom Family Combo.

After being in showbiz for 28 years, Lin finally won the Best Supporting Actress award in the Star Awards 2013 for her role as a con artist in Game Plan. Lin was visibly surprised with regard to her win. Prior to this, she was nominated for the same category for eight times, but never won. At the Star Awards 2019, Lin won her second Best Supporting Actress award for her role in Fifty & fabulous, where she acted alongside the likes of many other veteran artistes such as Marcus Chin, Jin Yinji, Zheng Geping, Aileen Tan, Chew Chor Meng & Chen Xiuhuan.

Personal life
Lin married actor Huang Yiliang in 1991 and have a daughter, Chantalle Ng, in 1995. They however divorced in 1997 wherein Lin initiated it. When interviewed in 2009, Huang attributed their split to their differences in characters and philosophies in life.

Filmography

Television

Film

Awards and nominations

References

External links

Living people
1963 births
Singaporean actresses
Singaporean people of Hokkien descent
Singaporean television actresses
20th-century Singaporean actresses
21st-century Singaporean actresses